The 2017 Colgate Raiders football team represented Colgate University in the 2017 NCAA Division I FCS football season. They were led by fourth-year head coach Dan Hunt and played their home games at Crown Field at Andy Kerr Stadium. They were a member of the Patriot League. They finished the season 7–4, 5–1 in Patriot League play to finish in a tie for the Patriot League championship with Lehigh. Due to their head-to-head loss over Lehigh, they did not receive a bid to the FCS Playoffs.

Schedule
The 2017 schedule consists of five home and six away games. The Raiders will host Patriot League foes Lehigh, Fordham, and Bucknell, and will travel to Holy Cross, Lafayette, and Georgetown.

In 2017, Colgate's non-conference opponents will be Cal Poly of the Big Sky Conference, Richmond of the Colonial Athletic Association, Buffalo of the Mid-American Conference, Furman of the Southern Conference, and Cornell of the Ivy League.

Game summaries

at Cal Poly

Richmond

at Buffalo

Furman

at Cornell

Lehigh

Fordham

at Holy Cross

Bucknell

at Lafayette

at Georgetown

Ranking movements

References

Colgate
Colgate Raiders football seasons
Patriot League football champion seasons
Colgate Raiders football